Kriscia García (born 20 September 1963) is a Salvadoran long-distance runner. She competed in the women's marathon at the 1988 Summer Olympics. She finished seventh in the 1500 metres at the 1987 Pan American Games.

References

1963 births
Living people
Athletes (track and field) at the 1984 Summer Olympics
Athletes (track and field) at the 1988 Summer Olympics
Salvadoran female long-distance runners
Salvadoran female marathon runners
Olympic athletes of El Salvador
Athletes (track and field) at the 1987 Pan American Games
Athletes (track and field) at the 1999 Pan American Games
Pan American Games competitors for El Salvador
World Athletics Championships athletes for El Salvador
Place of birth missing (living people)
Central American Games gold medalists for El Salvador
Central American Games medalists in athletics
Central American Games bronze medalists for El Salvador
Central American and Caribbean Games medalists in athletics